Johann Gottfried Schicht (29 September 1753 – 16 February 1823) was a German composer and conductor.

Schicht was born in Reichenau, in the Electorate of Saxony. He trained as a lawyer, studying from 1776 at Leipzig. He was the conductor of the Leipzig Gewandhaus Orchestra from 1785 to 1810, when he was succeeded by Johann Philipp Christian Schulz. Schicht continued to work in Leipzig, serving as Thomaskantor, director of the Thomanerchor with responsibility for music in the city's churches. He was in post from 1810 until 1823, when he died, aged 69, in Leipzig.

His most important work is a great choirbook from 1819. Besides that, he wrote masses, motets, cantatas, a setting of the 100th Psalm, four Te deums, one piano concerto, sonatas and capriccio.

He is believed to have been the editor of the first edition of Bach's motets.

References

External links 
 
 

1753 births
1823 deaths
People from Bogatynia
People from the Electorate of Saxony
German conductors (music)
German male conductors (music)
Thomaskantors